Christopher Hole (by 1511-70) was an English politician.

Life
Hole was born in Devon by 1511. By 1548, he had married Dorothy, a widow from London. They had one daughter. He inherited a messuage and some land in South Tawton, Devon, which he sold by 1523. He bought more property in the area.

Career
Hole was a lawyer, mainly based in Dorset. He was a Member of Parliament for Dorchester in 1545, 1547, 1554 and 1558, during the reigns of Henry VIII, Edward VI, Mary I and Elizabeth I.

Death
He lived his property around South Tawton to his nephew, George Robinson, and the rest to his daughter Margaret and her husband, Stephen Brent, who were his executors.

References

Year of birth missing
1570 deaths
Members of the Parliament of England for Dorchester
Lawyers from Devon
English MPs 1545–1547
English MPs 1547–1552
English MPs 1554
English MPs 1558